Killbuck was a name given by whites to two 18th century Lenape (Delaware Indian) chieftains:

Bemino (fl. 1710s–1780s), known as John Killbuck, Sr
Gelelemend (1737–1811), Bemino's son, known as John Killbuck, Jr

See also
Kilbuck (disambiguation)
Killbuck, Ohio